The Mitfords: Letters Between Six Sisters is a 2007 book of selected letters between the Mitford sisters. It contains letters exchanged between Nancy Mitford, Pamela Mitford, Diana Mitford, Unity Mitford, Jessica Mitford and Deborah Mitford between 1925 and 2003. The book was edited by Diana Mitford's daughter-in-law, Charlotte Mosley. An estimated five percent of letters between the six sisters were included in the 834-page publication. The book was published by HarperCollins.

Reception
The book was well received both critically and commercially. In particular previously held perceptions were challenged. India Knight wrote in the Sunday Times; "we didn’t really know them especially well, it turns out. Jessica was not that good; Diana briefly sinister but also clever, kind, fatally loyal to her Blackshirt husband, Oswald Mosley, and so on." The book was serialized by The Washington Post.

Format
The book is divided into nine chapters according to a specific time period. Each chapter is contextualized by the editor.

Chapter 1 (1925–1933)
Chapter 2 (1933–1939)
Chapter 3 (1939–1945)
Chapter 4 (1945–1949)
Chapter 5 (1950–1959)
Chapter 6 (1960–1966)
Chapter 7 (1967–1973)
Chapter 8 (1974–1994)
Chapter 9 (1995–2003)

See also
Hons and Rebels

References

External links
The Official Nancy Mitford Website

2007 non-fiction books
Books by Diana Mitford
Books by Jessica Mitford
HarperCollins books
Collections of letters